Events from the year 1971 in the United States.

Incumbents

Federal government 
 President: Richard Nixon (R-California)
 Vice President: Spiro Agnew (R-Maryland)
 Chief Justice: Warren E. Burger (Minnesota)
 Speaker of the House of Representatives: John William McCormack (D-Massachusetts) (until January 3), Carl Albert (D-Oklahoma) (starting January 21)
 Senate Majority Leader: Mike Mansfield (D-Montana)
 Congress: 91st (until January 3), 92nd (starting January 3)

Events

January

 January 1 – The Uniform Monday Holiday Act takes effect: Washington's Birthday and several other federal holidays are always observed on certain Mondays, resulting in more three-day weekends for federal employees.
 January 2 – A ban on radio and television cigarette advertisements goes into effect in the United States.
January 8
Voyageurs National Park is established.
Gulf Islands National Seashore is established.
 January 12 – The landmark television sitcom All in the Family, starring Carroll O'Connor as Archie Bunker, debuts on CBS.
 January 17 – Super Bowl V: The Baltimore Colts defeat the Dallas Cowboys 16–13 at the Orange Bowl in Miami, Florida.
 January 25 – In Los Angeles, Charles Manson and three female "Family" members are found guilty of the 1969 Tate-LaBianca murders.
 January 31 – Apollo program: Apollo 14 (carrying astronauts Alan Shepard, Stuart Roosa, and Edgar Mitchell) lifts off on the third successful lunar landing mission.

February
 February 9
The 6.5–6.7  Sylmar earthquake hits the Greater Los Angeles Area with a maximum Mercalli intensity of XI (Extreme), killing 58–65 and injuring 200–2,000.
Apollo program: Apollo 14 returns to Earth after the third manned Moon landing.
Satchel Paige becomes the first Negro league player to become voted into the Baseball Hall of Fame.
 February 11 – The U.S., United Kingdom, and the USSR (along with others) sign the Seabed Treaty, outlawing nuclear weapons on the ocean floor.
 February 20 
The Mississippi Delta tornado outbreak leaves 123 dead and more than 1,592 injured.
The U.S. Emergency Broadcast System sends an erroneous warning; many radio stations ignore it.

March
 March 1 – A bomb explodes in the men's room at the U.S. Capitol; the Weather Underground organization claims responsibility.
 March 8 – Boxer Joe Frazier defeats Muhammad Ali in a 15-round unanimous decision at Madison Square Garden.
 March 24 – Congress discontinues funding for supersonic transport (SST); primary contractor was 
 March 29 
U.S. Army Lieutenant William Calley is found guilty of 22 murders in the My Lai massacre and sentenced to life in prison. After intervention from President Nixon, he is released in 1974. 
 A Los Angeles jury recommends the death penalty for Charles Manson and three female followers.
 March 30 – The first Starbucks coffee shop opens, in Pike Place Market, Elliott Bay, Seattle.

April
 April 9 – Charles Manson is sentenced to death; in 1972, the sentence for all California death row inmates is commuted to life imprisonment (see Furman v. Georgia).
 April 10 – Veterans Stadium in Philadelphia opens.
 April 15 – The 43rd Academy Awards ceremony, hosted by 34 various "Friends of Oscar", is held at Dorothy Chandler Pavilion in Los Angeles. Franklin J. Schaffner's Patton wins seven awards, including Best Picture and Best Director for Schaffner. The film is also tied with George Seaton's Airport in receiving ten nominations. George C. Scott becomes the first actor to reject an Oscar, declining his Best Actor win.
 April 20 
 Swann v. Charlotte-Mecklenburg Board of Education: The Supreme Court of the United States rules unanimously that busing of students may be ordered to achieve racial desegregation.
 National Public Radio goes live.
 April 24 – Five hundred thousand people in Washington, D.C., and 125,000 in San Francisco march in protest against the Vietnam War.
 April 30 – The Milwaukee Bucks win the championship of the National Basketball Association in just their third season, completing a four-game sweep of the Baltimore Bullets in the finals.

May
 May 1 – Amtrak begins inter-city rail passenger service in the United States.
 May 3
 A Harris Poll claims that 60% of Americans are against the Vietnam War.
 Anti-war activists attempt to disrupt government business in Washington, D.C.; police and military units arrest as many as 12,000, most of whom are later released.
 May 5 – The US dollar floods the European currency markets and threatens especially the Deutsche Mark; the central banks of Austria, Belgium, Netherlands and Switzerland stop the currency trading.
 May 9 – Mariner 8 fails to launch.
 May 29 – Al Unser wins the Indianapolis 500 in the Vel's Parnelli Jones Special Colt-Ford.
 May 30 – Mariner program: Mariner 9 is launched toward Mars.

June
 June – Massachusetts passes its Chapter 766 laws enacting Special Education.
 June 1 – Vietnam War: Vietnam Veterans for a Just Peace, claiming to represent the majority of U.S. veterans who served in Southeast Asia, speak against war protests.
 June 6 – A midair collision between Hughes Airwest Flight 706 Douglas DC-9 jetliner and a U.S. Marine Corps McDonnell Douglas F-4 Phantom jet fighter near Duarte, California, claims 50 lives.
 June 10 – The U.S. ends its trade embargo of China.
 June 13 – Vietnam War: The New York Times begins to publish the Pentagon Papers.
 June 17 – Representatives of Japan and the United States sign the Okinawa Reversion Agreement, whereby the U.S. will return control of Okinawa.
 June 18 – Southwest Airlines, the most successful low cost carrier in history, begins its first flights between Dallas, Houston and San Antonio.
 June 25 – Madagascar accuses the U.S. of being connected to the plot to oust the current government; the U.S. recalls its ambassador.
 June 27
 Concert promoter Bill Graham closes the legendary Fillmore East, which first opened on 2nd Avenue (between 5th and 6th Streets) in New York City on March 8, 1968.
 WTVP (PBS) first airs in Peoria, Illinois.
 June 28
 Assassin Jerome A. Johnson shoots Joe Colombo in the head in a middle of an Italian-American rally, putting him in a coma and paralyzing him. He dies seven years later as a result of his injuries.
 Lemon v. Kurtzman: The Supreme Court of the U.S. rules in a landmark case on the Establishment Clause. 
 June 30 – New York Times Co. v. United States: The Supreme Court of the U.S. rules that the Pentagon Papers may be published, rejecting government injunctions as unconstitutional prior restraint.

July

 July 1 – The Postal Reorganization Act goes into effect, replacing the Cabinet-level Post Office Department with the United States Postal Service.
 July 3 – Jim Morrison, lead singer and lyricist of The Doors, is found dead in his bathtub in Paris, France.
 July 5 – Right to vote: The 26th Amendment to the United States Constitution is formally certified by President Richard Nixon, lowering the voting age from 21 to 18.
 July 26 – Apollo 15 (carrying astronauts David Scott, Alfred Worden, and James Irwin) is launched.
 July 31 – Apollo 15 astronauts David Scott and James Irwin become the first to ride in a lunar rover, a day after landing on the Moon.

August
 August – The unemployment rate peaks at 6.1%.
 August 1 – In New York City, 40,000 people attend the Concert for Bangladesh.
 August 7 – Apollo 15 returns to Earth.
 August 11 – Construction begins on the Louisiana Superdome in New Orleans.
 August 15 – President Richard Nixon announces that the United States will no longer convert dollars to gold at a fixed value, effectively ending the Bretton Woods system. He also imposes a 90-day freeze on wages, prices and rents.
 August 20 – The  spills  of fuel oil on President Nixon's Western White House beach in San Clemente, California.

September
 September 4 – A Boeing 727 (Alaska Airlines Flight 1866) crashes into the side of a mountain near Juneau, Alaska, killing all 111 people on board.
 September 8 – In Washington, D.C., the John F. Kennedy Center for the Performing Arts is inaugurated, with the opening feature being the premiere of Leonard Bernstein's Mass.
 September 9–September 13 – Attica Prison riots: A revolt breaks out at the maximum-security prison in Attica, New York. In the end, state police and the United States National Guard storm the facility; 42 are killed, 10 of them hostages.
 September 22 – Ernest Medina is cleared of all charges connected with the My Lai massacre.
 September 28 – Cardinal József Mindszenty, who had taken refuge in the U.S. Embassy in Budapest since 1956, is allowed to leave Hungary.
 September 30 – Unruly fans storm the field at Robert F. Kennedy Memorial Stadium during the final game for the second incarnation of the Washington Senators, who will move to Arlington, Texas, prior to the next season and become the Texas Rangers. The Senators, leading the New York Yankees 7–5 with two out in the ninth inning when fans invade the diamond, are forced to forfeit.

October
 October 1 – Walt Disney World opens in Orlando, Florida.
 October 17 – The Pittsburgh Pirates defeat the Baltimore Orioles, 4 games to 3, to win their fourth World Series title.
 October 18 – In New York City, the Knapp Commission begins public hearings on police corruption.
 October 21 – U.S. President Richard Nixon nominates Lewis Franklin Powell Jr. and William H. Rehnquist to the U.S. Supreme Court.
 October 23 – Texas Christian University football coach Jim Pittman collapses on the sideline and dies from a massive heart attack while coaching the Horned Frogs during a game against Southwest Conference rival Baylor in Waco, Texas.
 October 24 – Detroit Lions wide receiver Chuck Hughes collapses and dies of a heart attack near the end of a game against the Chicago Bears in Detroit.
 October 29 – Vietnam War: Vietnamization: The total number of American troops in Vietnam drops to a record low of 196,700 (the lowest since January 1966).

November

 November 6 – Operation Grommet: The U.S. tests a thermonuclear warhead at Amchitka Island in Alaska, code-named Project Cannikin. At around 5 megatons, it is the largest ever U.S. underground detonation.
 November 12 – Vietnam War: Vietnamization: U.S. President Richard Nixon sets February 1, 1972, as the deadline for the removal of another 45,000 American troops from Vietnam.
 November 12 – Arches National Park is established.
 November 13 – Mariner program: Mariner 9 becomes the first spacecraft to enter Mars orbit successfully.
 November 15 – Intel releases the world's first commercially available microprocessor, the Intel 4004.
 November 24 – During a severe thunderstorm over Washington, a man calling himself D. B. Cooper parachutes from the Northwest Orient Airlines plane he hijacked, with US$200,000 in ransom money, and is never seen again.

December
 December 8 – U.S. President Richard Nixon orders the 7th Fleet to move towards the Bay of Bengal in the Indian Ocean.
 December 10
 The John Sinclair Freedom Rally in support of the imprisoned activist features a performance by John Lennon at Crisler Arena in Ann Arbor, Michigan.
 George Lucas founds Lucasfilm.
 December 11
 The Libertarian Party (United States) is established.
 An explosion in a water tunnel beneath Lake Huron in Port Huron, Michigan, kills 22.
 December 18
 The U.S. dollar is devalued for the second time in history. 
 Capitol Reef National Park is established.
 December 22 – KUAC-TV in Fairbanks, Alaska, launches, becoming the 49th state's first public television station.
 December 23 – Rudolph The Red Nosed Reindeer airs for the last time on NBC, as KENI-TV (now KTUU-TV) in Anchorage, Alaska, KFAR-TV (now KATN, current ABC affiliate) in Fairbanks Alaska, KHON-TV (current Fox affiliate) in Honolulu, Hawaii, and KUAM-TV in Guam air the special in prime time. It will move to CBS a year later.
 December 25 – In the longest game in NFL history, the Miami Dolphins beat the Kansas City Chiefs 27–24 after 22 minutes, 40 seconds of sudden death overtime.

Undated
 Meet Each Need with Dignity (MEND), non-profit organization is founded in California.
 Save a Heart Foundation is established in Baltimore.

Ongoing
 Cold War (1947–1991)
 Space Race (1957–1975)
 Vietnam War, U.S. involvement (1964–1973)
 Détente (c. 1969–1979)

Births

January 
 January 1
 Bridget Pettis, basketball player
 Denise Stapley, sex therapist and former game show contestant, winner of Survivor: Philippines
 January 2
 Taye Diggs, actor
 Renée Elise Goldsberry, American actress
 Lisa Harrison, basketball player 
 January 7
 Jeremy Renner, actor
 Kevin Rahm, actor
 January 8 – Jason Giambi, American baseball player
 January 11 – Mary J. Blige, singer
 January 15 – Regina King, actress
 January 18 – Jonathan Davis, musician (Korn)
 January 19 – Shawn Wayans, actor, writer, and producer
 January 20 
 Brian Giles, baseball player
 Derrick Green, singer-songwriter 
 Questlove, drummer, DJ, and producer
 January 23 
 Kevin Mawae, American football player and coach
 Marc Nelson, singer-songwriter
 January 24 – Kenya Moore, actress and model
 January 30 
 Lizzie Grubman, publicist
 Kimo von Oelhoffen, American football player

February 
 February 1
 Rebecca Creskoff, actress
 Michael C. Hall, actor
 Jill Kelly, pornographic actress
 Hynden Walch, actress
 February 2 – Kevin Symons, actor
 February 4
 Rob Corddry, actor and comedian
 Eric Garcetti, 42nd mayor of Los Angeles
 Michael A. Goorjian, actor, director, producer, and screenwriter
 February 5 – Sara Evans, singer
 February 6 – Brian Stepanek, actor
 February 9 – Sharon Case, model and actress
 February 10 
 Lisa Marie Varon, professional wrestler
 Annie Wood, actress, writer and television personality
 February 12 – Scott Menville, actor and voice actor
 February 13 – Matt Berninger, singer-songwriter 
 February 14 – Tommy Dreamer, wrestler
 February 16 – Dan Green, voice actor and voice director
 February 17 – Denise Richards, actress
 February 20 – Calpernia Addams, actress, author, and activist
 February 21 – Randy Blythe, heavy metal singer (Lamb of God) 
 February 22 – Lea Salonga, internationally-known Filipina singer and Broadway actress
 February 24 – Josh Bernstein, anthropologist, explorer, and author
 February 25 – Sean Astin, actor
 February 28 – Amanda Davis, writer and teacher (d. 2003)

March 
 March 4 
 Emily Bazelon, journalist
 Shavar Ross, actor and producer
 March 5 
 Yuri Lowenthal, actor, voice actor, producer and screenwriter
 Scott Mosier, producer
 March 7 
 Peter Sarsgaard, actor
 Kali Troy, voice actress
 March 9 
 Mike DelGuidice, musician and singer/songwriter
 Emmanuel Lewis, actor
 March 11 – Johnny Knoxville, daredevil, actor, comedian, screenwriter and film producer
 March 15 – Chris Patton, voice actor
 March 21 – Craig McCracken, animator, director, and producer
 March 22
 Keegan-Michael Key, actor, writer, and comedian
 Will Yun Lee, Korean-American actor
 March 23 – Karen McDougal, model
 March 26 – Erick Morillo, DJ, music producer, and record label owner (d. 2020)
 March 29 – Robert Gibbs, White House Press Secretary
 March 30 – Mari Holden, cyclist
 March 31 – Craig McCracken, animator, writer, and cartoonist

April 
 April 3 
 David Michael Barrett, screenwriter and film producer 
 Picabo Street, skier
 April 10 – Joey DeFrancesco, musician (d. 2022)
 April 12 – Shannen Doherty, actress
 April 15 – Jason Sehorn, American football player
 April 16
 Peter Billingsley, actor, director, and producer
 Selena, entertainer and Tejano singer (d. 1995)
 April 18 – Fredro Starr, rapper
 April 19 – Wendy Powell, voice actress
 April 20
 Allan Houston, basketball player
 Mikey Welsh, musician and artist (d. 2011)
 April 22 – Eric Mabius, actor
 April 26 – Shondrella Avery, actress
 April 28 – Bridget Moynahan, actress
 April 29
 Darby Stanchfield, actress
 Tamara Johnson-George, singer

May 
 May 1 – Ethan Albright, American football player
 May 11 – Malaika Griffin, anti-white racist convicted of the 1999 murder of Jason Patrick Horsley
 May 5 – Dresta, rapper
 May 8 – Ross Anderson, pro speed skier
 May 12 
 Doug Basham, wrestler
 Jamie Luner, actress
 May 14 – Sofia Coppola, screenwriter, film director, producer and actress, daughter of Francis Ford Coppola
 May 15 – Phil Pfister, strength athlete
 May 18 – Desiree Horton, helicopter pilot, television reporter and aerial firefighter
 May 19 – Stephanie Nadolny, voice actress and singer
 May 20 – Tony Stewart, race car driver
 May 25 – Sonya Smith, actress
 May 26 – Matt Stone, television producer
 May 27 – Lisa Lopes, rapper, singer, songwriter and dancer (d. 2002 in Honduras)
 May 28 – Marco Rubio, U.S. Senator from Florida from 2011
 May 30
 John Ross Bowie, actor and comedian
 Idina Menzel, Actress and Singer-Songwriter

June 
 June 4
 Noah Wyle, actor
 Mike Lee, United States Senator from Utah since 2011
 June 5
 Robert Melson, murderer (d. 2017) 
 Mark Wahlberg, actor and singer
 June 7
Terrell Buckley, American football player and coach
Alex Mooney, lawyer and politician
 June 8 
 Mark Feuerstein, actor, director, and producer
 Troy Vincent, American football player
 June 10 – Bobby Jindal, 55th Governor of Louisiana from 2008 to 2016
 June 12 – Mark Henry, wrestler
 June 15 – Jake Busey, actor, musician, and film producer
 June 16 – Tupac Shakur, rapper, poet, actor, and murder victim (d. 1996)
 June 18 – Nathan Morris, singer
 June 22
 Kurt Warner, American football player
 Mary Lynn Rajskub, actress and comedian

July 
 July 1 
 Julianne Nicholson, actress
 Missy Elliott, singer
 Melissa Peterman, actress and comedian
 July 3 – Beans, rapper 
 July 4 – Al Madrigal, comedian, writer, actor and producer
 July 9 – Marc Andreessen, software engineer and entrepreneur
 July 10 
 Aaron D. Spears, actor
 Jennifer A. Nielsen, author
 July 11 – Brett Hauer, ice hockey player
 July 12
 Kristi Yamaguchi, figure skater
 Loni Love, comedian
 July 13 
 Jason Danieley, actor, singer, concert performer and recording artist
 Craig Elliott, illustrator
 July 14
 Mark LoMonaco, professional wrestler
 Joey Styles, professional wrestling announcer
 July 15 – Jim Rash, actor 
 July 16
 Corey Feldman, actor
 Ed Kowalczyk, singer-songwriter
 July 18 
 Penny Hardaway, basketball player
 Joseph Russo, film and television director
 July 19 
 Russell Allen, singer and lyricist
 Andrew Kavovit, actor
 July 20
 William DeMeo, actor, producer, director and writer
 DJ Screw, hip hop DJ (d. 2000)
 July 22 
 Kristine Lilly, soccer player
 Aaron McCargo Jr., chef, TV personality and TV show host
 July 23
 Alison Krauss, country singer
 Scott Krippayne, Christian musician
 July 26 – Reggie Carthon, American football player
 July 28 – Jeffrey S. Williams, journalist and author
 July 29 – Monica Calhoun, actress
 July 30 – Christine Taylor, actress and wife of Ben Stiller

August 
 August 4
 Jeff Gordon, race car driver
 Yo-Yo, rapper
 August 12
 Michael Ian Black, actor and comedian
 Yvette Nicole Brown, actress and comedian
 Pete Sampras, tennis player
 August 18 – Jacob Vargas, actor
 August 23 – Gretchen Whitmer, 49th Governor of Michigan
 August 28 – Janet Evans, swimmer
 August 29 – Carla Gugino, actress
 August 31 – Chris Tucker, actor and comedian

September 
 September 2
 Tommy Maddox, American football player
 Shauna Sand, model and actress
 September 8 – Brooke Burke-Charvet, model
 September 9 
 Eric Stonestreet, actor
 Henry Thomas, actor and musician
 September 11
 Markos Moulitsas, soldier, activist, blogger, and author
 Shelton Quarles, American football player and scout
 September 14
 Christopher McCulloch, actor and voice actor
 Kimberly Williams-Paisley, actress
 September 15 
 Josh Charles, actor
 Colleen Villard, voice actress
 September 16 – Amy Poehler, actress
 September 18
 Lance Armstrong, cyclist
 Jada Pinkett Smith, actress
 September 19 – Sanaa Lathan, actress
 September 21
 Alfonso Ribeiro, actor, television director, dancer, and host of America's Funniest Home Videos
 Luke Wilson, actor
 September 22
 Ted Leonard, singer (Enchant)
 Lawrence Gilliard Jr., African-American actor
 September 23 – Sean Spicer, 30th White House Press Secretary
 September 24 – Michael S. Engel, paleontologist & entomologist
 September 25
 John Lynch, American football player
 Brian Dunkleman, comedian and actor
 September 26 – Joel Breton, video game producer
 September 30
 Jeff Whitty, writer
 Jenna Elfman, actress

October 
 October 2
 Tiffany, singer
 Chris Savino, cartoonist, animator, director, storyboard artist, writer, comic book artist and producer
 October 3 – Kevin Richardson, singer
 October 8 – Sean Palmer, actor
 October 9 – Stevie Richards, wrestler
 October 10 – Tiffany Mynx, porn actress and director
 October 13 – Billy Bush, radio and television host
 October 17
 Martin Heinrich, politician and U.S. Senator (D-New Mexico)
 Chris Kirkpatrick, singer ('N Sync)
 Blues Saraceno, rock guitarist, composer and music producer
 October 24 
 Caprice Bourret, model and actress
 Aaron Bailey, American football player
 Zephyr Teachout, academic
 October 26 
 Jim Butcher, author
 Anthony Rapp, actor and singer 
 October 29 – Winona Ryder, actress

November 
 November 2 – Eric Wall, writer and political activist
 November 3 – Jonathan Blow, video game designer and programmer
 November 5
 Dana Jacobson, sportscaster
 Corin Nemec, actor, producer and screenwriter
 November 7 – Robin Finck, guitarist
 November 8
 Tech N9ne, rapper
 Benjamin King, actor
 Naomi Biden daughter of Joe Biden (d. 1972)
 November 9 – Big Pun, rapper (d. 2000)
 November 10
  1971   – Holly Black, journalist, author, and poet
  1971   – Terry Pearson, baseball player
 November 11 – David DeLuise, actor and son of Dom DeLuise and Carol Arthur
 November 13 – Noah Hathaway, actor
 November 20 – Joel McHale, comedian, actor, writer, television producer, and television personality
 November 21 – Michael Strahan, American football player and television personality
 November 23
 Lisa Arch, actress and comedian
 Chris Hardwick, actor and comedian
 November 27 – Kirk Acevedo, actor

December 
 December 1 – John Schlimm, writer
 December 5 – Kali Rocha, actress
 December 6 – Ryan White, HIV victim (d. 1990)
 December 7 – Stephanie D'Abruzzo, actress, puppeteer and singer
 December 10 – Michele Mahone, television entertainment reporter, previously make-up artist and hair stylist
 December 13 – Henry Dittman, actor, voice actor and television host
 December 15 – Monica Lee Gradischek, actress and voice actress
 December 16 – Michael McCary, singer
 December 19 – Tyson Beckford, model
 December 23 – Corey Haim, actor 
 December 26 – Jared Leto, actor and musician
 December 27 
 Savannah Guthrie, television host and anchor
 Jason Hawes, paranormal investigator and businessman
 December 28 – Frank Sepe, bodybuilder and model

Deaths

 January 4 – Arthur Ford, psychic, founder of Spiritual Frontiers Fellowship (b. 1896)
 January 15 – John Dall, actor (b. 1920)
 January 20 – Broncho Billy Anderson, actor, director, writer, and producer (b. 1880)
 January 21 – Richard Russell Jr., United States Senator from Georgia; President pro tempore during the 91st Congress (b. 1897)
 January 24 – Bill W., co-founder of Alcoholics Anonymous (b. 1897)
 February 3 – Jay C. Flippen, actor (b. 1899)
 February 12 – James Cash Penney, businessman (b. 1875)
 February 17 – Adolf A. Berle, lawyer, educator, author and diplomat (b. 1895)
 March 8 – Harold Lloyd, silent comedy filmmaker (b. 1893)
 March 11 – Philo Farnsworth, inventor, television pioneer (b. 1906)
 March 12 – David Burns, actor (b. 1902)
 March 16 
 Bebe Daniels, actress (b. 1901)
 Thomas E. Dewey, 47th Governor of New York and Republican nominee for president (b. 1902)
 March 22 – Nella Walker, actress and vaudevillian (b. 1886)
 March 24 – George G. O'Connor, general (b. 1914)
 April 3 – Joseph Valachi, gangster (b. 1904)
 April 6 – Igor Stravinsky, composer (b. 1882 in Russia)
 April 15 – Dan Reeves, businessman, owner of the National Football League's Los Angeles Rams (b. 1912)
 May 19 – Ogden Nash, poet (b. 1902)
 June 15 – Wendell Meredith Stanley, chemist, Nobel Prize laureate (b. 1904)
 July 3 – Jim Morrison, singer-songwriter and poet, died in Paris, France (b. 1943)
 July 4 – August Derleth, author and anthologist (b. 1909)
 July 6 – Louis Armstrong, African American jazz trumpeter and actor (b. 1901)
 July 7 – Ub Iwerks, animator, cartoonist, character designer, inventor and special effects technician (b. 1901)
 August 12 – Sally Crute, actress (b. 1886)
 August 13 – King Curtis, saxophonist (b. 1934)
 August 15 – Paul Lukas, actor (b. 1894 in Budapest)
 August 25 – Ted Lewis, bandleader (b. 1890)
 August 27 – Margaret Bourke-White, photographer (b. 1904)
 September 25 – Hugo Lafayette Black, Associate Justice of the Supreme Court of the United States 1937–71 (b. 1886)
 October 2 – Richard H. Jackson, admiral (b. 1866)
 October 9 – Billy Costello, voice actor, original voice of Popeye (b. 1898)
 October 11 – Chester Conklin, actor (b. 1888)
 October 12
 Dean Acheson, 51st United States Secretary of State (b. 1893)
 Gene Vincent, rockabilly singer (b. 1935)
 October 24 – Carl Ruggles, composer (b. 1876)
 October 29 – Duane Allman, rock guitarist (b. 1946)
 November 10 – Walter Van Tilburg Clark, novelist (b. 1909)
 December 7 – Ferdinand Pecora, lawyer (b. 1882 in Sicily)
 December 9 – Ralph Bunche, Nobel diplomat (b. 1904)
 December 18 – Bobby Jones, amateur golfer (b. 1902)
 December 29 – Stuart Holmes, actor (b. 1884)

See also 
 List of American films of 1971
 Timeline of United States history (1970–1989)

References

External links
 

 
1970s in the United States
United States
United States
Years of the 20th century in the United States